The Greek bagpipe(s) may refer to:

Tsampouna, a double-chantered, droneless bagpipe played mostly in the Greek Islands
Askomandoura, a Cretan bagpipe similar to the tsampouna
Dankiyo, a bagpipe played in the historically ethnic Greek regions of Trabzon and Rize in what is now Turkey
Gaida, a type of bagpipe played in northern Greece and the Balkans

Bagpipes by country